Lester Chang is an American politician who is the member of the New York's 49th State Assembly district, he defeated longtime Democratic incumbent Peter J. Abbate Jr. in the 2022 New York State Assembly election. Although there were questions about his residency, he was nonetheless seated by the State Assembly.

Political career
Chang first ran in the 2016 special election in the 65th Assembly district to succeed Sheldon Silver following his resignation due to a corruption scandal. He placed third to Yuh-Line Niou and Alice Cancel. He then ran in 2020 in the 26th State Senate district. He placed second to the incumbent Brian Kavanagh.

References

Living people
21st-century American politicians
New York (state) Republicans
Year of birth missing (living people)